Made in Cape Breton is the first of three albums by the Celtic band The Cottars. Recorded at Lakewind Sound Studios in Cape Breton, Nova Scotia, and released in 2002 by Warner Music.

Track listing
 Sùilean Dubh (trad.)– 2:45
 The Captain Campbell Medley – 4:07
 Captain Campbell (trad.)
 Calum Breugach (trad.)
 Wedding Reel #1 (trad.)
 Cui's a Christ Mhóir Mi (Wedding Reel #3) (trad.)
 The High Road to Linton (trad.)
 I Know Who Is Sick (trad.) – 1:50
 The Boy's Lament Medley – 5:10
 The Boy's Lament For His Dragon (trad.)
 Jessie Smith (trad.)
 A Taste Of Gaelic (trad.)
 Brenda Stubbert's Reel (Jerry Holand/Fiddlestick Music)
 Ballinderry (trad.) – 5:33
 The Two Brothers Medley – 5:26
 Two Brothers (Irving Gordon/Welbeck Music Corp.)
 O'Keefe's Slide (trad.)
 The Tenpenny Bit (trad.)
 Scarlet Ribbons (Segal-Levine/EMI Mills Music) – 3:49 - With special guest John McDermott
 Ciarán's Piano Medley – 5:40
 My Lodging's On The Cold Ground/Endearing Young Charms (trad.)
 The Lass O' The Corrie Mill (trad.)
 The Growling Old Man And Old Woman (trad.)
 The Golden Wedding Reel (trad.)
 The Coulin / Hornpipes Medley – 4:52
 The Coulin (trad.) / The Green Castle (trad.)
 The Harvest Home (trad.)
 The Briar & The Rose (Tom Waits/Jalma Music Inc.) – 5:09 First Single
 The Pleasure of Home Medley – 3:28
 The Pleasures Of Home Fackler
 I Have A Wife Of Me Ain (trad.)
 Gabrielle's Jig (John Morris Rankin/Ole Sound Productions)
 Here's To Song (Allister MacGillivray/Cabot Trail Music, Socan) – 4:38 - With special guest John McDermott
 Kitchen Racket – 1:49

Musical contributions
 The Cottars
 Ciarán MacGillivray (age 13): piano, tin whistle, bodhrán, vocals, step-dancing
 Fiona MacGillivray (age 12): tin whistle, bodhrán, lead vocals, step-dancing
 Jimmy MacKenzie (age 14): guitar, bodhrán
 Roseanne MacKenzie (age 11): fiddle, harmony vocals, step-dancing
 Additional Musicians
 John McDermott
 Brigham Phillips
 Gordie Sampson
 Al Bennett
 Allister MacGillivray
 Beverly MacGillivray
 Patrick Kilbride
 Deborah Quigley
 Wendy Rose
 Anne Lindsay
 Claudio Bena
 Audrey King

Awards earned

 East Coast Music Award, 2003
 M.I.A.N.S Award, 2003

Additional information
 Executive Producer: John McDermott
 Arranger/Musical Director: Allister MacGillivray
 String Arrangements: Brigham Phillips
 Producers: Allister MacGillivray & Brigham Phillips
 Recording and Mixing Engineer: Gary Gray
 Assistant Engineers: Mike "Sheppy" "Shepherd and Nathan Handy
 Recording Studios: Lakewind Sound and Manta DSP
 Mastering: Charles Gray, Saluki Music
 Photography, Design & Layout: Carol Kennedy
All traditional songs and tunes were adapted and arranged by Allister MacGillivray and The Cottars.

External links
Cottars
The Cottars

2002 debut albums
The Cottars albums